Augustyn Andrzej Skórski (6 November 1936 – 22 January 1981) was a Polish ice hockey player. He played for Górnik Katowice and Baildon Katowice during his career. He won the Polish league championship in 1958 with Górnik. Skórski also played for the Polish national team at the 1964 Winter Olympics and several World Championships.

He died aged 44 in a road accident.

References

External links
 

1936 births
1981 deaths
Baildon Katowice players
GKS Katowice (ice hockey) players
Ice hockey players at the 1964 Winter Olympics
Olympic ice hockey players of Poland
People from Przeworsk County
Sportspeople from Podkarpackie Voivodeship
Polish ice hockey defencemen
Road incident deaths in Poland